The Chebdar is a river in Altai Republic in Russia.

The Chebdar is the only significant and paddleable tributary of the Bashkaus, coming in from the left where the Lower Gorge of the Bashkaus ends, not far from Chulyshman confluence.

The river starts on the plateau west to the lower Bashkaus valley and for the first  it is a small stream flowing north. At the point where Chebdar valley swings east (towards Bashkaus), three large tributaries, each nearly the size of the main river, come in and make it paddleable. The last of these, Synyrlu, has a trail along coming down to the confluence and this was reported as the optimal put-in.

This section was reported as quite similar to the Lower Gorge of the Bashkaus, but narrower, tougher, steeper and with less water. Both banks are generally not passable, and there is significant rock fall danger especially during rainy weather.

References

External links 
 Kayaking in Russia